In American football, a back is a player who plays off of the line of scrimmage (as opposed to a lineman). Historically, the term "back" was used to describe multiple positions on offense and defense, although more descriptive and specific position naming is now common. Thus, "back" can refer to positions including:

Cornerback, a member of the defensive team that primary defends wide receivers
Defensive back, a member of the defensive team who take positions somewhat back from the line of scrimmage
Dimeback, a cornerback or safety who serves as the sixth defensive back
Fullback, one of the two running back positions, along with the halfback
Halfback, one of the two running back positions, along with the fullback
H-back, an offensive position that lines up similarly to a tight end, but is set back from the line of scrimmage
Linebacker, a member of the defensive team that is positioned approximately three to five yards behind the line of scrimmage
Nickelback, a cornerback or safety who serves as the additional defensive back in a nickel defense
Quarterback, a member of the offensive team that lines up directly behind the offensive line and receives the snap of the ball at the beginning of a play
Running back, a member of the offensive backfield whose primary role is to receive handoffs from the quarterback to run with the ball
Singleback, an offensive formation that only requires one running back
Slotback, a wide receiver on the offensive team that is positioned in the "slot" (located between the last offensive lineman/tight end and the next wide receiver)
Upback, a blocker who lines up behind the line of scrimmage in punting situations
Wingback, a position in the single wing formation, usually a running back

See also
History of American football positions
Tailback (disambiguation)

Broad-concept articles
American football positions